Diatraea brunnescens is a moth in the family Crambidae. It was described by Harold Edmund Box in 1931. It is found in Brazil and Venezuela.

References

Chiloini
Moths described in 1931